Los Angeles City Council District 4 is one of the 15 districts of the Los Angeles City Council, situated in Central Los Angeles, the southern San Fernando Valley, and eastern Santa Monica Mountains. It is represented by Councilmember Nithya Raman, the first woman to represent the district.

Geography

Present day location

The 4th District is at the center of Los Angeles.  The unusually shaped district reaches into Koreatown and Mid-Wilshire on the south; through the Miracle Mile, Fairfax District, and Hollywood Hills into Sherman Oaks on the west; through much of Hollywood and over Cahuenga Pass into North Hollywood on the north; and through Los Feliz and Griffith Park into much of Silver Lake on the east.

For all the communities represented, see the official City of Los Angeles map of District 4.

The council district includes many of the city's tourist destinations, such as the Hollywood Boulevard district, the La Brea Tar Pits and Los Angeles County Museum of Art, Farmers Market and The Grove, Griffith Park with the Hollywood Sign and Griffith Observatory, the Hollywood Bowl, and district adjacent Universal Studios.

Historical locations
A new city charter effective in 1925 replaced the former "at large" voting system for a nine-member council with a district system with a 15-member council. Each district was to be approximately equal in population, based upon the voting in the previous gubernatorial election; thus redistricting was done every four years. (At present, redistricting is done every ten years, based upon the preceding U.S. census results.) The numbering system established in 1925 for City Council districts began with No. 1 in the north of the city, the San Fernando Valley, and ended with No. 15 in the south, the Harbor area.

As the city expanded to the north and west, the 4th District's boundaries likewise shifted in those directions.

1925: Bounded on the north by Santa Monica Boulevard, east by Vermont or Hoover Avenue, south by Washington Boulevard and west by Western Avenue. It was described later the same year as simply "Wilshire and Pico Heights."

1926: Wilshire District,  with headquarters at 671 South Berendo Street (modern Koreatown).

1928: "With the exception that seven precincts are added to it in the territory bounded by Vermont Avenue and Hoover Street and Sunset Boulevard and Melrose Avenue, the lines . . . remain as Hoover street on the east, Western avenue on the west, Melrose avenue on the north and Washington street on the south."

1932–33: ". . . due to the exceptional growth of the western part of the city, a general movement toward the ocean was necessary." East boundary: Hoover. North: Melrose. West: Highland Avenue. South: Pico Boulevard or Wilshire.

1935: Roughly the same as in 1932.

1937: Bounded on the west by Crenshaw Boulevard, on the north by District 5 and Exposition Boulevard, on the east by the city boundary and on the south by Vernon Avenue.

1940: "The general trend is westward and northeastward, due to heavy construction in the San Fernando Valley and the beach areas." North: Santa Monica Boulevard or Melrose. East: Hoover. South: Wilshire.

1955: ". . . much of the Wilshire district and in general is bounded by Fountain Ave., Wilshire Blvd., Fairfax Ave. and Catalina St."

1975: Central Los Angeles from Fairfax and Highland Avenues on the west, to Santa Monica Boulevard on the north, the Pasadena Freeway on the east and Olympic Boulevard on the south.

1986: A contorted district that included the old areas as well as Atwater, Griffith Park, Forest Lawn Drive and parts of the central San Fernando Valley to Colfax Avenue and Victory Boulevard.<ref>[https://search.proquest.com/docview/154826193 "Los Angeles' Realigned Council Districts," Los Angeles Times," September 21, 1986, page B-3]</ref>

1989: ". . . district stretches from Hancock Park to Studio City.

Population
As of the 2000 census,  45% of district residents were Caucasian, 26.9% Latino, 18% Asian-American, 6% African-American, and 4% either Native American, mixed race, or other.  Almost half of residents were foreign born.

Officeholders

The district has been represented by eight council members, the smallest number of any district in the city.

See also
 Los Angeles City Council districts
 Los Angeles City Council
 List of Los Angeles municipal election returns

References

Note: Access to most Los Angeles Times'' links requires the use of an LAPL library card.

External links
 Official Los Angeles City Council District 4 website
 City of Los Angeles: Map of District 4

LACD04
LACD04
LACD04
LACD04
LACD04
LACD04
LACD04
LACD04
LACD04
LACD04
LACD04
LACD04
LACD04
LACD04
LACD04
LACD04
LACD04